Benjamin King Woodhull House is a historic home located at Wading River in Suffolk County, New York. It was built in 1750, and is two story, side hall type dwelling of wood-frame construction with secondary extensions to the south and east.  Also on the property is an outhouse.

It was added to the National Register of Historic Places in 2008.

References

External links
Four Chimneys (Benjamin King Woodhull House) at National Register of Historic Places
"State adds Woodhull House to list of historic places" by Jen Nuzzo; July 31, 2011
Benjamin King Woodhull House (Clio)

Houses on the National Register of Historic Places in New York (state)
Houses completed in 1750
Houses in Suffolk County, New York
National Register of Historic Places in Suffolk County, New York